In functional analysis, a branch of mathematics, a strictly singular operator  is a bounded linear operator between normed spaces which is not bounded below on any infinite-dimensional subspace.

Definitions. 

Let X and Y be normed linear spaces, and denote by B(X,Y) the space of bounded operators of the form .  Let  be any subset.  We say that T is bounded below on  whenever there is a constant  such that for all , the inequality  holds.  If A=X, we say simply that T is bounded below.

Now suppose X and Y are Banach spaces, and let  and  denote the respective identity operators. An operator  is called inessential whenever  is a Fredholm operator for every . Equivalently, T is inessential if and only if  is Fredholm for every .

We say that  is finitely strictly singular whenever for each  there exists  such that for every subspace E of X satisfying , there is  such that .

Let  denote the closed unit ball in X.  An operator  is compact whenever  is a relatively norm-compact subset of Y, and denote by  the set of all such compact operators.

Properties. 

Strictly singular operators can be viewed as a generalization of compact operators, as every compact operator is strictly singular. These two classes share some important properties. This same "spectral theorem" consisting of (i)-(iv) is satisfied for inessential operators in B(X).

In general, we have , and each of the inclusions may or may not be strict, depending on the choices of X and Y.

Examples. 

Here  is the Banach space of sequences converging to zero. This is a corollary of Pitt's theorem, which states that such T, for q < p, are compact.

If  then the formal identity operator  is finitely strictly singular but not compact. In this case we have . However, every inessential operator with codomain  is strictly singular, so that . On the other hand, if X is any separable Banach space then there exists a bounded below operator  any of which is inessential but not strictly singular. Thus, in particular,  for all .

Duality. 

The compact operators form a symmetric ideal, which means  if and only if . To establish duality relations, we will introduce additional classes.

If Z is a closed subspace of a Banach space Y then there exists a "canonical" surjection  defined via the natural mapping .  An operator  is called strictly cosingular whenever given an infinite-dimensional closed subspace Z of Y, the map  fails to be surjective.  Denote by  the subspace of strictly cosingular operators in B(X,Y).

Theorem 1.  Let X and Y be Banach spaces, and let .  If T* is strictly singular (resp. strictly cosingular) then T is strictly cosingular (resp. strictly singular).

Note that there are examples of strictly singular operators whose adjoints are neither strictly singular nor strictly cosingular (see Plichko, 2004). Similarly, there are strictly cosingular operators whose adjoints are not strictly singular, e.g. the inclusion map .

Theorem 2.  Let X and Y be Banach spaces, and let .  If T* is inessential then so is T.

References

Aiena, Pietro, Fredholm and Local Spectral Theory, with Applications to Multipliers (2004), .

Plichko, Anatolij, "Superstrictly Singular and Superstrictly Cosingular Operators," North-Holland Mathematics Studies 197 (2004), pp239-255.

Compactness (mathematics)
Operator theory
Linear operators